Alfred Albert Edward Ernest Theodore Muswellbrooke Orlando Vassa Reid (1867 – 5 August 1945), nicknamed Alphabet Reid, was an Australian politician.

He was born in Penrith to Michael and Ann Clara Reid. He became a baker, and in 1898 married Mary Ann Robertson. He served on Penrith Municipal Council from 1895 to 1898 and was mayor in 1898, and after moving to Manly around 1907 served on Manly Council from 1915 and 1928 (mayor from 1919 to 1921). In 1920 he was elected to the New South Wales Legislative Assembly as one of the members for North Shore; he was initially an independent, but subsequently joined the Nationalist Party. He did not stand for election  in 1922 and was re-elected in 1925. In 1927, when single-member electorates were re-introduced, he became the member for Manly. He lost Democratic preselection for the 1944 state election and ran successfully as an independent Democrat. He joined the Liberal Party in 1945 but died later that year at Manly.

See also

References

 

1867 births
1945 deaths
Independent members of the Parliament of New South Wales
Nationalist Party of Australia members of the Parliament of New South Wales
United Australia Party members of the Parliament of New South Wales
Liberal Party of Australia members of the Parliament of New South Wales
Members of the New South Wales Legislative Assembly
Mayors of Penrith, New South Wales
Mayors of Manly, New South Wales
New South Wales local councillors
People from Manly, New South Wales